The MOSAIC Multicultural Festival is an annual festival held in the Roma Street Parkland, coordinated by Multicultural Australia, with assistance from the Queensland Government, Brisbane City Council, and local sponsors. The festival includes performances, food stalls, and information booths from a range of groups representing various cultural communities residing in the Brisbane area. The festival aims to celebrate the rich cultural contributions that communities bring to multicultural Queensland expressed though dance, music, spoken word poetry and storytelling, visual arts and crafts, children’s and family activities and food.

Gallery

See also

List of festivals in Brisbane

References

External links 

 Multicultural Australia MOSAIC 2021

Festivals in Brisbane
Cultural festivals in Australia
Annual events in Brisbane